The 1922 New South Wales state election was held on 25 March 1922. This election was for all of the 90 seats in the 26th New South Wales Legislative Assembly and it was conducted in multiple member constituencies using the Hare Clark single transferable vote. The 25th parliament of New South Wales was dissolved on 17 February 1922 by the Governor, Sir Walter Edward Davidson, on the advice of the Premier James Dooley.

Key dates

Results

{{Australian elections/Title row
| table style = float:right;clear:right;margin-left:1em;
| title        = 1922 New South Wales state election
| house        = Legislative Assembly
| series       = New South Wales state election
| back         = 1920
| forward      = 1925
| enrolled     = 1,251,023
| total_votes  = 875,734
| turnout %    = 70.00
| turnout chg  = +13.81
| informal     = 31,771
| informal %   = 6.63
| informal chg = −6.07
}}

|}

Retiring members

Changing seats

See also
 Candidates of the 1922 New South Wales state election
 Members of the New South Wales Legislative Assembly, 1922–1925

Notes

References

Elections in New South Wales
New South Wales state election
1920s in New South Wales
New South Wales state election